The Journal of Hospitality & Tourism Research is a peer-reviewed academic journal that covers research in the field of hospitality. Its editors-in-chief are Chris Roberts, Misty Johanson and Linda Shea. It was established in 1976 as the Hospitality Research Journal, obtaining its current title in 1998, and is published by SAGE Publications on behalf of the Council on Hotel, Restaurant, and Institutional Education.

Abstracting and indexing 
The journal is abstracted and indexed in Scopus and the Social Sciences Citation Index. According to the Journal Citation Reports, its 2017 impact factor is 2.685.

References

External links 
 
 Council on Hotel, Restaurant, and Institutional Education

SAGE Publishing academic journals
English-language journals
Publications established in 1976
Quarterly journals
Tourism journals